Love Starts After Dark is the fourth and final album by Gene Page.  It was produced by  Billy Page and Gene Page.

Track listing
"Love Starts After Dark" (Leon Sylvers) 	 5:32   	
"With You in the Night" (Herb Alpert, Leon Ware)	4:00 	
"Put a Little Love in You Lovin'" (Ray Parker Jr.)	5:40 	
"Second Time Around" (Emmett North, Robert Jackson, Tony Churchill)	4:50 	
"You are the Meaning of this Song" (Leon Sylvers III, Nidra Beard)	3:33 	
"Hold On to That Groove" (Eddie Watkins, Phyllis St. James)	5:54 	
"Hollywood" (Joe Sample, Will Jennings)	4:35 	
"I Wanna Dance"  (Jack Gerard, Lon Van Eaton)	3:45

External links
 Gene Page-Love Starts After Dark at Discogs

1980 albums
Gene Page albums
Albums arranged by Gene Page
Arista Records albums